The women's javelin throw event at the 2014 Asian Games was held at the Incheon Asiad Main Stadium, Incheon, South Korea on 1 October.

Schedule
All times are Korea Standard Time (UTC+09:00)

Records

Results 
Legend
DNS — Did not start

References

Results

Javelin throw women
2014 women